was a Japanese manga artist and writer.

Biography
Nakazawa was born March 14, 1939
Naka-ku, Hiroshima, Japan and was in the city when it was destroyed by an atomic bomb in August 1945. Most of his family members who had not evacuated died as a result of the explosion after they became trapped under the debris of their house, except for his mother and an infant sister (who died several weeks later  whether from malnutrition or radiation from her mother afterward).

In 1961, Nakazawa moved to Tokyo to become a full-time cartoonist and produced short pieces for manga anthologies such as Shōnen Gaho, Shōnen King, and Bokura.

Following the death of his mother in 1966, Nakazawa returned to his memories of the destruction of Hiroshima and began to express them in his stories. Kuroi Ame ni Utarete (Struck by Black Rain), the first of a series of five books, was a fictional story of Hiroshima survivors involved in the postwar black market. Nakazawa chose to portray his own experience in the 1972 story Ore wa Mita, published in Monthly Shōnen Jump. The story was translated into English and published as a one-shot comic book by Educomics as I Saw It.

Immediately after completing I Saw It, Nakazawa began his major work, Hadashi no Gen (Barefoot Gen). This series, which eventually filled ten volumes, was based on the same events as I Saw It but expanded and fictionalized, with the young Gen Nakaoka as a stand-in for the author. Barefoot Gen depicted the bombing and its aftermath in extremely graphic detail, with Gen's experiences being even more harrowing than Nakazawa's own. It also turned a critical eye on the militarization of Japanese society during World War II and on the sometimes abusive dynamics of the traditional family. Barefoot Gen was adapted into a trilogy of live action movies, two animated films, and a live action TV drama.

Nakazawa announced his retirement in September 2009, citing deteriorating diabetes and cataract conditions. He cancelled plans for a Barefoot Gen sequel. In September 2010, Nakazawa was diagnosed with lung cancer; in July 2011, metastasis from lung cancer was found. He died on December 19, 2012.

Works

Legacy
Nakazawa was the subject of the Japanese documentary, Barefoot Gen's Hiroshima (2011), directed by Yuko Ishida.

See also
 White Light/Black Rain: The Destruction of Hiroshima and Nagasaki

References

Further reading

External links
Interview

Manga artists from Hiroshima Prefecture
People from Hiroshima
Hibakusha
1939 births
2012 deaths
Deaths from lung cancer in Japan